Christchurch Thistle was a soccer club in New Zealand. The club lost 6 of the clubs first 11 during World War II, including Alan Charles Davies. Club President Mr. A McAnulty said that "while the club was proud of the way in which its members had rallied to the colours, it felt keenly the loss of so many promising young players."

Competed
 1929 Chatham Cup
 1930 Chatham Cup
 1931 Chatham Cup
 1934 Chatham Cup (runner-up)

Players
 George McAnulty Alan Davies

Association football clubs in Christchurch